Dendrobium aqueum is a species of orchid endemic to southern India. It is found in the
upper reaches of western ghats.

References

aqueum
Endemic orchids of India
Flora of Kerala